Aruppukkottai railway station is located in Aruppukkottai, Tamil Nadu connecting Manamadurai and Virudhunagar. It is administered under Madurai railway division. A new railway line from – Via  Aruppukkottai was proposed in the Third Five Year plan, which was supposed to ease the pressure on the existing – and – sections. On 1 September 1963, the   –  section was opened, along with Aruppukkottai railway station in the same year by the then Chief Minister of Tamil Nadu, K. Kamaraj. And on 2 May 1964, the rest of   –  section was thrown to traffic. Opened with meter gauge tracks, the  This station catering immensely the passengers of the region and Tuticorin for traffic of goods.

Overview 
This line connects southern districts to delta districts. A proposed new route from Madurai – Thoothukudi via this station is under construction, which would make the station become a junction.

Current Situation 
After reopening only 2 Express trains Runs on this station one is Puducherry Kanniyakumari weekly express which ran as the first express train in this station and this station was inaugurated with this train after conversion to Broad gauge. The second train is Silambu Express which is also a Tri weekly super fast express train which runs from Chennai Egmore to Sengottai. Initially this train ran from  Manamadurai. After a prolonged demands from people, this train has been extended till sengottai. Apart from these express trains there is a DEMU passenger train that runs daily between Karaikudi and Virudhunagar.

See also 
 Chennai Egmore railway station
 Virudhunagar Junction railway station
 Manamadurai Junction railway station
 Madurai Junction railway station
 Tuticorin railway station

References

External links 

 
 Southern Railway

Railway stations in Virudhunagar district
Madurai railway division
Railway stations opened in 1963
1963 establishments in India